France has submitted films for the Academy Award for Best International Feature Film since the conception of the award in 1956. France has been one of the most successful countries in the world in this category, and more than half of their Oscar submissions have achieved Oscar nominations. , France has submitted 66 films for consideration. Of these, 38 have achieved Oscar nominations and nine have won the award, not including Honorary Awards.

The award is handed out annually by the United States Academy of Motion Picture Arts and Sciences to a feature-length motion picture produced outside the United States that contains primarily non-English dialogue.

The Academy Award for Best Foreign Language Film was not created until 1956; however, between 1947 and 1955, the Academy presented Honorary Awards to the best foreign language films released in the United States. These awards were not competitive, as there were no nominees but simply a winner every year that was voted on by the Board of Governors of the Academy. Three French films received Honorary Awards during this period. For the 1956 Academy Awards, a competitive Academy Award of Merit, known as the Best Foreign Language Film Award, was created for non-English-speaking films, and has been given annually since.

The French submission is decided annually by the Centre national de la cinématographie, affiliated with the French Ministry of Culture.

Submissions
The Academy of Motion Picture Arts and Sciences has invited the film industries of various countries to submit their best film for the Academy Award for Best Foreign Language Film since 1956. The Foreign Language Film Award Committee oversees the process and reviews all the submitted films. Following this, they vote via secret ballot to determine the five nominees for the award. Before the award was created, the Board of Governors of the Academy voted on a film every year that was considered the best foreign-language film released in the United States, and there were no submissions.

France is the only country that has submitted a film every year since the creation of the award in 1956 and also the only country which has been nominated at more than half of the occasions where the award was given.

Below is a list of the films that have been submitted by France for review by the Academy. All submissions were primarily in French, with the notable exceptions of the winning Portuguese-language Black Orpheus in 1959, which was a co-production with Brazil and Mustang in 2015, which was in Turkish.

Notes
 Russian title: Восток-Запад

References
General

Specific

France
Academy Award